Thipparthy is a village in the Nalgonda district in Telangana. It is located in Thipparthy mandal of Nalgonda division. Gunda Sathyanarayana served as sarpanch for 15 years

Geography
It has an average elevation of 221 metres (728 ft).

References

Villages in Nalgonda district
Mandal headquarters in Nalgonda district